Sir Laurence Rupert "Jim" McIntyre  (22 June 191221 November 1981) was an Australian public servant and diplomat.

Career
McIntyre joined the Department of External Affairs in 1940.

In September 1952, McIntyre was appointed Australian Commissioner for Malaya, having served as Acting Commissioner in the year before.

In November 1959, McIntyre's appointment as Australian Ambassador to Japan was announced. His term in Japan was extended to take in the 1964 Olympic Games in Tokyo.

He was President of the United Nations Security Council in October 1973, during the 1973 Arab–Israeli War and was lauded for capably handling the situation in the role.

Awards and honours
In 1953, McIntyre was made an Officer of the Order of the British Empire whilst he was Commissioner to Malaya in Singapore. He was promoted to a Commander of the Order in 1960 during his posting as Ambassador to Indonesia. In 1963, McIntyre was appointed a Knight Bachelor, whilst on posting as ambassador in Tokyo.

On Australia Day in 1979, McIntyre was made a Companion of the Order of Australia.

The McIntyre Bluffs in Antarctica are named in honour of McIntyre.

References

1912 births
1981 deaths
Australian Commanders of the Order of the British Empire
Australian Knights Bachelor
Companions of the Order of Australia
Ambassadors of Australia to Indonesia
Ambassadors of Australia to Japan
Permanent Representatives of Australia to the United Nations